Jignipurwa is a village at Sarwan Khera in Kanpur Dehat, northern India.

Gram Panchayat: Lohari

Tehsil Name: Akbarpur

About 
Jignipurwa is a small village/hamlet in Akbarpur tehsil in Kanpur dehat district of Uttar Pradesh state, India.

It comes under Lohari gram panchayat. It belongs to Kanpur division. It is 21 km to the east of district headquarters, Akbarpur, Kanpur Dehat. It is 4 km from Sarwankhera.

Here a temple of god Shiva known as "Bada shiv mandir" and in Jignipurwa have many small temples of god Shiva. There have two primary junior high schools. Outside of village is a big pound known as "Bajar wala Talab". The market of Jignipurwa opens on Sundays and Thursday also.

Cultural activities 
The village is rich in cultural activities and youths of this village registered a society named as "Tejas Jan Samiti" for cultural, sports, educational and motivational purpose.
Villages in Kanpur Dehat district